The Nicolina is a right tributary of the river Bahlui in eastern Romania. It flows into the Bahlui in the city Iași.

References

External links

Rivers of Romania
Rivers of Iași County